The following tables show the Italy national football team's all-time international record.

Performances

Performance by coach
Last match updated was against Austria on 20 November 2022.

 Coach in bold is currently active.

Competition records 
 Champions   Runners-up   Third Place   Tournament played fully or partially on home soil

FIFA World Cup

*Denotes draws include knockout matches decided via penalty shoot-out.

UEFA European Championship

*Denotes draws include knockout matches decided via penalty shoot-out.

UEFA Nations League

*Denotes draws include knockout matches decided via penalty shoot-out.

Defunct competitions

FIFA Confederations Cup

*Denotes draws include knockout matches decided via penalty shoot-out.

Central European International Cup

Other tournaments

*Denotes draws include knockout matches decided via penalty shoot-out.

Head-to-head record

Key

Last match updated was against Austria on 20 November 2022.
 Draws include Penalty shoot-outs
 Countries that are in italics are now defunct, as well as the matches played against the Europe XI and World XI teams

Notes

References

Hat
National association football team all-time records